"Crazy (Keep On Falling)" is a song by American group The John Hall Band. It was released as a single in 1981 from their album All of the Above. Bob Leinbach provided the lead vocals for this song.

The song narrowly missed the Top 40 on the Billboard Hot 100, peaking at No. 42. However, it was a Top 20 on the Mainstream Rock charts, peaking at No. 13. This became the band's biggest hit.

Chart performance

References

1981 singles
1981 songs
EMI America Records singles
Songs written by John Hall (New York politician)